Babita Shrestha is a Nepalese director, known for her work in the Nepalese folk music industry. She has been directing music videos since 2011 (2068 BS). The song Ek Hazar Ko Note is one of her best known works. She has directed multiple Lokdohori (Nepalese folk genre) music videos and has won multiple awards for her contribution in that field.

Biography
She has directed numerous Nepali Lok Dohori songs, since 2011. She is also the chairmen of Nepal EPIC Music Awards and a board member of Nepal Music Video Directors Society. She has directed more than five hundred music videos. In 2018 (2075 BS), she was nominated for ten awards and won received six awards for directing music videos.

Awards

Notable works

References 

Music directors
Living people
1980 births
People from Lalitpur District, Nepal
Newar people
Nepalese directors